The Gatlinburg Space Needle is a  tall observation tower in Gatlinburg, Tennessee, United States. The tower has an outdoor observation level that provides a 360 degree view of the Great Smoky Mountains and the city of Gatlinburg. Upon completion in 1969, it was the second tallest tower in the state of Tennessee. Currently it is the fifth tallest in the state, after several non-guyed TV and radio towers.

Along with being the tallest structure in the city of Gatlinburg, the Space Needle base also hosts an arcade with video games, escape games and the Impossibilities magic show theater.

References

External links 
 Official website
 Gatlinburg attractions - Space Needle

Towers completed in 1969
Towers in Tennessee
Buildings and structures in Sevier County, Tennessee
Tourist attractions in Sevier County, Tennessee
Gatlinburg, Tennessee